WilkinsonEyre is an international architecture practice based in London, England. In 1983 Chris Wilkinson founded Chris Wilkinson Architects, he partnered with Jim Eyre in 1987 and the practice was renamed WilkinsonEyre in 1999. The practice has led the completion of many high-profiled projects such as Gateshead Millennium Bridge, Cooled Conservatories Gardens by the Bay, Oxford's Weston Library and Guangzhou International Finance Center.

Project list 
Key projects:

Bridges
 Toronto Eaton Centre, Queen Street Bridge
 Twin Sails Bridge, Poole
 The Peace Bridge, Derry, UK
 Forthside Bridge, Stirling, UK
 Gateshead Millennium Bridge, Gateshead
 Lille Langebro, Copenhagen, Denmark

Cultural
 Wellcome Collection, London, UK
 Cooled Conservatories, Gardens by the Bay
 Weston Library, Oxford, UK
 Mary Rose Museum, Portsmouth, UK
 Wellcome, The Medicine Galleries at the Science Museum, London, UK

Education
 Dyson Institute Village (Campus Expansion), Malmesbury
 City and Islington College: Centre for Lifelong Learning
 University of Bristol: Fry Building, Bristol, UK
 University of Exeter: Forum Project, Exeter, UK
 Magna Science Adventure Centre, Rotherham, UK

Public Buildings
 Hull Paragon Interchange, Kingston upon Hull, UK
 Stratford station, London, UK

Tall Buildings
Crown Sydney Sydney, Australia
One Queensbridge Melbourne, Australia
 CIBC Square Toronto, Canada
 Guangzhou International Finance Centre, Guangzhou, China 
 10 Brock Street, London, UK
Sports and Leisure
 Splashpoint Leisure Centre, Worthing, UK
 London Olympic Basketball Arena, London, UK
 Battersea Power Station, London, UK
 Liverpool Arena & Conservation Centre, Liverpool, UK

Publications 
The Sketchbooks of Chris Wilkinson, Royal Academy Publication

Works, Thames and Hudson

Techtonics, Black Dog Publishing

Supernature, Oro Editions

Exploring Boundaries, Birkhauser

Bridging Art & Science, Booth-Clibborn Editions

Destinations, WilkinsonEyre

New Bodleian - Making the Weston Library

Awards 
 BCO Award, 8 Finsbury Circus (2017)
 RIBA Award, Building of the Year, Weston Library (2016)
 AJ100 Building of the Year, Weston Library (2016)
 British Constructional Steelwork Association's Structural Steel Award, Splashpoint Leisure Centre (2014)
 Building Award, Mary Rose Museum (2014)
 New London Award, Battersea Power Station (2014)
 Civic Trust Award, Twin Sails Bridge (2014)
 ISE Award, Emirates Air Line (2013)
 RIBA Lubetkin Prize, Cooled Conservatories, Gardens by the Bay (2013)
 World Architecture Festival Award, Sport Category, Splashpoint Leisure Centre (2013)
 RIBA Lubetkin Prize, Guangzhou International Finance Center (2012)
 RIBA Stirling Prize, Gateshead Millennium Bridge (2002)
 RIBA Stirling Prize, Magna (2001)

References

External links 

Architecture firms based in London
Stirling Prize laureates
Companies established in 1983
Bridge architects
1983 establishments in England